Zeno Koen Debast (born 24 October 2003) is a Belgian professional footballer who plays as a centre-back for Belgian First Division A club Anderlecht and the Belgium national team.

Club career
Debast is a youth product of Anderlecht, signing his first contract in October 2019. He made his professional debut on 2 May 2021, in a 2–2 Belgian First Division A draw against Club Brugge.

International career
In September 2022 Debast received his first call-up to the senior Belgian squad for the UEFA Nations League matches against Wales and Netherlands.

References

External links
 
 

2003 births
Living people
Belgian footballers
Association football central defenders
R.S.C. Anderlecht players
Belgian Pro League players
2022 FIFA World Cup players
Belgium youth international footballers
Belgium international footballers
People from Halle, Belgium
Footballers from Flemish Brabant